Cattle Drive is a 1951 American Western film directed by Kurt Neumann and starring Joel McCrea, Dean Stockwell and Chill Wills. Much of the film was shot in the Death Valley National Park, California and Paria, Utah.

Plot
Chester Graham Jr. (Dean Stockwell), the spoiled young son of a wealthy railroad owner, gets lost in the middle of nowhere when he wanders away from a train during a water stop. He is found by a cowboy (Joel McCrea) who is part of a cattle drive. Lucky to be alive, the boy has to tag along with the cowboys. He learns the value of hard work, self-discipline and comradeship while working with the men on the trail to Santa Fe.

Influences
The basic story—about a rich brat who gets lost in a dangerous place far from home, then learns character and values from the working men who rescue him—echoes that of 1937's Oscar-winning film Captains Courageous, adapted from a novel by Rudyard Kipling. The key difference, besides the fact that the leading man does not get killed in the end, is that "Cattle Drive" is set in a desert area and not at sea.

Cast
 Joel McCrea as Dan Matthews
 Dean Stockwell as Chester Graham Jr.
 Chill Wills as Dallas
 Leon Ames as Chester Graham Sr.
 Henry Brandon as Jim Currie
 Howard Petrie as Cap
 Bob Steele as Charlie "Careless" Morgan
 Griff Barnett as Conductor O'Hara

Production
Parts of the film were shot in Paria, Utah, and Death Valley.

See also
Cattle drive

References

External links
 
 
 

1951 films
Universal Pictures films
1951 Western (genre) films
Films directed by Kurt Neumann
American Western (genre) films
Films shot in Utah
Films shot in California
1950s English-language films
1950s American films